United Nations Security Council resolution 899, adopted unanimously on 4 March 1994, after recalling Resolution 833 (1993) and considering a letter by the Secretary-General Boutros Boutros-Ghali concerning the matter of the Iraqi private citizens and their assets which remained on Kuwaiti territory following the demarcation of the international boundary between Iraq and Kuwait, the council, acting under Chapter VII of the United Nations Charter, decided that compensation payments may be remitted to the private citizens concerned in Iraq, notwithstanding the provisions of Resolution 661 (1991).

See also
 Gulf War
 Invasion of Kuwait
 Kuwait–Iraq barrier
 List of United Nations Security Council Resolutions 801 to 900 (1993–1994)

References

External links
 
Text of the Resolution at undocs.org

 0899
 0899
1994 in Iraq
1994 in Kuwait
March 1994 events